Salvatore Ferragamo (5 June 1898 – 7 August 1960) was an Italian shoe designer and the founder of luxury goods high-end retailer Salvatore Ferragamo S.p.A. An innovative shoe designer, Salvatore Ferragamo established a reputation in the 1930s. In addition to experimenting with materials including kangaroo, crocodile, and fish skin, Ferragamo drew on historic inspiration for his shoes.

Early life
Salvatore (registered as "Salvadore") Ferragamo was born in 1898 to a poor family in Bonito, in the Campania region of Italy, near Avellino, the eleventh of fourteen children of Antonio Ferragamo and Mariantonia Ferragamo (both had the same surname, which often happened in smaller Italian towns). After making his first pair of shoes for himself, a pair of high heels, at age nine (and his sisters to wear at their confirmation), young Salvatore decided that he had found his calling.

Career
After studying shoemaking in Naples for a year, Ferragamo opened a small store based in his parents' home. In 1915, he emigrated to Boston, Massachusetts, where one of his brothers worked in a cowboy boot factory. After a brief stint at the factory, Ferragamo convinced his brothers to move to California, first Santa Barbara then Hollywood. It was there that Ferragamo found success, initially opening a shop for repair and made-to-measure shoes, leading to a long period of designing footwear for the cinema.

Reluctant to accept that his shoes could be beautiful but uncomfortable to wear, he studied anatomy at the University of Southern California.

After spending thirteen years in the US, Ferragamo returned to Italy in 1927, settling in Florence. He began to fashion shoes for prominent women, including the Maharani of Cooch Behar, Eva Perón and Marilyn Monroe. He opened a workshop in the Via Mannelli, experimenting with design, while applying for patents for his innovations. He filed for bankruptcy in 1933 due to bad management and economic pressure, but was able to expand his operations in the 1950s, including a workforce of 700 artisans who made 350 pairs of shoes per day, by hand.

"The Rainbow" was created by Salvatore Ferragamo in 1938 and was the first instance of the platform shoe returning in modern days in the West. The platform sandal was designed for American singer and actress Judy Garland. The shoe was a tribute to Garland's signature song "Over the Rainbow" performed in The Wizard of Oz (1939) feature film. The shoe was crafted using shaped slabs of cork covered in suede with gold kidskin straps. He was inspired to experiment with new materials to find those not rationed during World War II.

Death and legacy
Salvatore Ferragamo died in 1960 at the age of 62, but his name lives on as an international company, which has expanded its operations to include luxury shoes, bags, eyewear, silk accessories, watches, perfumes and a ready-to-wear clothing line. At his death, his wife Wanda and later their six children (Fiamma, Giovanna, Fulvia, Ferruccio, Massimo and Leonardo) ran the company. 

His most famous invention is arguably the "Cage heel". Fiamma (Salvatore's eldest daughter who died in 1998) came up with the "Vara pumps" in 1978.

A museum dedicated to Ferragamo's life and work opened in the Palazzo Spini Feroni in 1995. The palazzo had been bought by Ferragamo in the 1930s.

In March 2013, Ferragamo's fashion house, Salvatore Ferragamo S.p.A., established the Ferragamo Foundation in Florence. The foundation was formed to cultivate young fashion designers, based on the ideas of Salvatore Ferragamo.

Present day
The company is owned by the Ferragamo family, which in November 2006 included Salvatore's widow Wanda, five children, 23 grandchildren and other relatives. There is a rule that only three members of the family can work at the company, prompting fierce competition.

Family
 Wanda Ferragamo Miletti led the group since 1960, when her husband and founder of the company, Salvatore, died. She was honorary chairman until her death in 2018.
 Ferruccio Ferragamo, chairman of the company
 Giovanna Gentile-Ferragamo, vice president of Salvatore Ferragamo SpA
 Leonardo Ferragamo, since 2000, has been the Director of Salvatore Ferragamo SpA, Ferragamo Finanziaria; Executive Vice President of the Fondazione Ferragamo.
 Massimo Ferragamo, Chairman of Ferragamo USA.
 Fulvia Visconti-Ferragamo, who died in March 2018, ran the fashion label's silk accessories division beginning in the 1970s. She was the Deputy Chairwoman of Ferragamo Finanziaria SpA.
 Fiamma Ferragamo di San Giuliano, who died in 1998, was involved in the creation of some of the brand's products, such as Vara shoe and the Gancino.
 James Ferragamo, Women's and Men's Shoes and Leather Goods Division Director for the Salvatore Ferragamo Group
 Angelica Visconti Ruspoli, South Europe Director
 Diego Paternò di San Giuliano coordinates the digital activities of the brand.

References

Further reading

External links
 
 Official website of the Salvatore Ferragamo Museum

1898 births
1960 deaths
Fashion designers from Florence
Italian billionaires
Shoe designers
Altagamma members
People from the Province of Avellino
University of Southern California alumni
Salvatore Ferragamo
20th-century Italian businesspeople